The Brandon Teena Story is a 1998 American documentary film directed by Susan Muska and Greta Olafsdottir. The documentary features interviews with many of the people involved with the 1993 murder of Brandon Teena as well as archive footage of Teena. After its theatrical release, it aired on Cinemax as part of its Reel Life series.

Awards
Berlin Film Festival:Teddy Award for Best Documentary
GLAAD Media Award:GLAAD Media Award for Outstanding Documentary (nominee)
Vancouver Film Festival:Best Documentary Winner

References

Further reading
All She Wanted by Aphrodite Jones, a book released in 1996 about the murder.

External links 
 
 The Brandon Teena Story at Bless Bless Productions

Transgender-related documentary films
1998 LGBT-related films
1998 films
American documentary films
1998 documentary films
American LGBT-related films
Documentary films about violence against LGBT people
Films about trans men
Documentary films about Nebraska
Biographical films about LGBT people
1990s English-language films
1990s American films